Manuel Antonio Alberto Zelaya (born November 27, 1958) is a Honduran politician. A member of the Liberal Party of Honduras, he represents the Copan Department and is a deputy of 
the National Congress of Honduras for 2006–2010.

External links
Profile at the Congress website

Deputies of the National Congress of Honduras
1958 births
Living people
Liberal Party of Honduras politicians
People from Copán Department
Place of birth missing (living people)